Roberto Mirri (born 21 August 1978 in Imola) is an Italian former footballer who played as a defender.

Football career
Mirri started his professional career at AC Fiorentina, and was later sold to Empoli, at both clubs playing in Serie A. He also had a stint on loan at Catania in 2003. In the summer of 2004, Mirri was sold to Mons in Belgium.

Honours
Fiorentina
Supercoppa Italiana: 1996

References

External links
Profile at aic.football.it 

1978 births
Living people
People from Imola
Italian footballers
Italy under-21 international footballers
ACF Fiorentina players
Empoli F.C. players
Catania S.S.D. players
R.A.E.C. Mons players
Venezia F.C. players
F.C. Matera players
Serie A players
Serie B players
Serie C players
Serie D players
Association football central defenders
Italian expatriate footballers
Belgian Pro League players
Expatriate footballers in Belgium
Italian expatriate sportspeople in Belgium
Footballers from Emilia-Romagna
Sportspeople from the Metropolitan City of Bologna